The men's 4x100 metres relay at the 2012 IPC Athletics European Championships was held at the Stadskanaal Stadium from 24 to 29 June.

Medalists
Results given by IPC Athletics.

Results

See also
List of IPC world records in athletics

References

4x100 metres relay